Araeomolis is a genus of moths in the family Erebidae. The genus was erected by George Hampson in 1901.

Species
Araeomolis albipicta (Dognin, 1909)
Araeomolis haematoneura Joicey & Talbot, 1916
Araeomolis insignis Toulgoët, 1998
Araeomolis irregularis (Rothschild, 1909)
Araeomolis persimilis Rothschild, 1909
Araeomolis propinqua Toulgoët, 1998
Araeomolis rhodographa Hampson, 1901
Araeomolis robusta Toulgoët, 1987
Araeomolis rubens (Schaus, 1905)
Araeomolis transversa Toulgoët, 1993

References

Phaegopterina
Moth genera